This is a list of content of Hindi cinema.

 List of Hindi film actresses
 List of Hindi horror films
 List of Indian romance films 
 List of Hindi film families
 List of Indian film music directors
 List of Indian music families
 List of Indian playback singers
 List of Hindi film actors

Bollywood-related lists